This is a list of episodes of the two Japanese anime television series adaptations of the two-part adult visual novel series Ef: A Fairy Tale of the Two. by the Japanese software company Minori. The first anime adapts the whole first game Ef: The First Tale., and the first half of the second game Ef: The Latter Tale.. The second anime adapts the second half of the second game.

The first anime adaptation entitled Ef: A Tale of Memories. is directed by Shin Ōnuma who volunteered for the job when it was offered, and is produced by the Japanese animation studio Shaft. Katsuhiko Takayama wrote the series composition, Tenmon and Eiichiro Yanagi composed the series' music, and Nobuhiro Sugiyama (Shaft) designed the characters for animation and acted as chief animation director. Akiyuki Shinbo supervised the series. Half of the series was outsourced outside of Shaft: episodes 3 and 8 to Trans Arts; and episodes 4, 6, 9, and 11 to Studio Pastoral. The story follows three protagonists and their interactions with the girls they meet and gradually fall in love with. A short prologue DVD for Ef: A Tale of Memories. was released on August 24, 2007. The prologue is more of a teaser which introduces the characters and some conflict that appears in the first anime series. Ef: A Tale of Memories. aired between October 7, 2007 and December 22, 2007 on the Chiba TV Japanese television network, and was later aired on subsequent networks such as, including but not limited to, TV Kanagawa, TV Saitama, and Sun TV; there are twelve episodes. Each episode ends with a still image drawn by Japanese illustrators of anime, manga, and visual novels. The episode titles are originally written in English and as such there are no Japanese language equivalents. The first letter in each episode's title, plus the "coda" title of the last episode, can be brought together to form "Euphoric Field". The series was released in six limited and regular edition DVD compilations, each containing two episodes. The first DVD volume was released on December 7, 2007, and the sixth DVD was released on May 9, 2008.

The second anime adaptation entitled Ef: A Tale of Melodies. is produced by the same staff as with the first series, and contains the same cast of voice actors. Eight of its episodes were outsourced outside of Shaft: episodes 2, 5, 9, and 11 to Studio Pastoral; episode 3 to Trans Arts; episodes 4 and 8 to A.C.G.T; and episode 7 to Silver Link. Ef: A Tale of Melodies began airing in Japan on October 7, 2008 on TV Kanagawa.  Very much like the first season, the first letter in each episode's title reveals a hidden meaning.  The first six episodes spell out the word "future" backwards with the following six episodes having the prefix "re-" attached to five of the first six episode titles, but introduced in reverse. For example, episode six is entitled "flection" and episode seven is titled "reflection". For episode twelve, the title is "forever".

Ef: A Tale of Memories. uses four pieces of theme music for the episodes, one opening theme and three ending themes. The opening theme, starting with episode three, is the English version of "Euphoric Field" by Tenmon featuring Elisa. The first episode uses a background music track for the opening theme, and the second and tenth episodes have no opening theme; "Euphoric Field" was also used for the ending theme in episode two. The Japanese version is used as the opening theme for the twelfth episode. The first ending theme is "I'm here" by Hiroko Taguchi which is used for episodes one, three, seven, and ten. The second ending theme,  by Junko Okada, is used for episodes four, five, and nine. The third ending theme,  by Natsumi Yanase, is used for episode six, eight, and eleven, though the second verse of the song was used in that episode. A remix of the visual novel's theme song called  sung by Yumiko Nakajima is used as the ending theme in episode twelve.

The opening theme of Ef: A Tale of Melodies. is the English version of "Ebullient Future", also by Tenmon featuring Elisa, with the sixth episode featuring the instrumental version. The first ending theme is called  by Mai Goto while the second is called  by Yumiko Nakajima. A new version of the opening sequence of the first season was inserted in the middle of episode eleven. The song "A moon filled sky." was featured right after the ending of the same episode with the German translated lyrics that had been shown throughout the whole series with each of the words' own numberings.

Ef: A Tale of Memories.

Ef: A Tale of Melodies.

Notes

References

External links
Ef: A Tale of Memories. official website 
Ef: A Tale of Melodies. official website 

Ef